Zeng Shan (1899–1972) was a Chinese Communist military commander and security minister.  His wife, Deng Liujin, was one of the few women who participated in the Long March, and later ran a school for the children of high cadres.  He was the father of Zeng Qinghong, Vice President of the People’s Republic of China from 2003 to 2008.

Zeng backed Mao Zedong in the Jiangxi Soviet confrontation with Li Lisan, and was at one point Chairman of the Chinese Soviet Republic government. He was a key player in the violent 1931 purge of the so-called Anti-Bolshivik Corps.

Zeng did not participate in the Long March, but rather stayed behind to command a small guerrilla unit on the Guangdong-Guangxi border. At the end of the Civil War, he was serving in the Third Field Army’s 10th Army under Ye Fei, and became a member of the 8th and 9th Central Committees. He served a Minister of Internal Affairs (i.e., security) from 1960 to October 1969.

References

1899 births
1972 deaths
Chinese Communist Party politicians from Jiangxi
People's Liberation Army officers
Eighth Route Army personnel
Politicians from Ji'an
Government ministers of the People's Republic of China
People's Republic of China politicians from Jiangxi
Burials at Babaoshan Revolutionary Cemetery